Herbert Alonzo "Lon" McCallister Jr. (April 17, 1923 – June 11, 2005) was an American actor. According to one obituary, he was best known for "playing gentle, boyish young men from the country." Another said he "had an ingenuous appeal that made him a favourite of family audiences, and was particularly at home in outdoor settings featuring dogs and horses. Ultimately his perennial boyishness and slight stature became a handicap for more mature roles."

Early life
Born in Los Angeles, Lon McCallister was the son of a real estate broker. He attended Marken Professional School, which trained children for show-business careers and began appearing in movies at the age of 13. He had uncredited appearances in Let's Sing Again (1936) and Romeo and Juliet (1936), directed by George Cukor who, gave McAllister a large close up, and became a friend.

Career
He was uncredited in Stella Dallas (1937), Souls at Sea (1937), Make a Wish (1937), The Adventures of Tom Sawyer (1938), Judge Hardy's Children (1938), Lord Jeff (1938), That Certain Age (1938), Little Tough Guys in Society (1939), The Spirit of Culver (1939), Confessions of a Nazi Spy (1939), Babes in Arms (1939), First Love (1939), and Joe and Ethel Turp Call on the President (1939).

McCallister could also be glimpsed in Susan and God (1940), Henry Aldrich for President (1941), Dangerously They Live (1941), Always in My Heart (1942), Yankee Doodle Dandy (1942), Spy Ship (1942), Night in New Orleans (1942), That Other Woman (1942), Gentleman Jim (1942), Quiet Please: Murder (1942), Over My Dead Body (1942), The Hard Way (1943), and The Meanest Man in the World (1943). Columnist Hedda Hopper called him "the cutest boy the movies have hauled up out of obscurity since Mickey Rooney."

Stardom

At 20, he appeared in the World War II morale booster Stage Door Canteen, where he played a star struck serviceman with theater actress and producer Katharine Cornell. The Los Angeles Times said he stole the film with "his bashful smile and winning ways".

McCallister leapt to fame playing the lead as Sparke in the horse-racing tale Home in Indiana (1944), also starring Walter Brennan and Jeanne Crain.  This led to a contract with 20th Century Fox. He followed it with Winged Victory (1944) but then his career momentum was interrupted by war service.

Growing only to 5'6" he found it difficult to find roles as an adult. He appeared with Edward G. Robinson in 1947's The Red House and had the star role in Thunder in the Valley (1947), and supported June Haver in Scudda Hoo! Scudda Hay! (1948).

McCallister had the lead in another animal story The Big Cat (1949) and co-starred with Shirley Temple in The Story of Seabiscuit (1949). He was in The Boy from Indiana (1950).

Television
McCallister began appearing on TV in episodes of Suspense ("Lunch Box", "Collector's Item"), and Lux Video Theatre ("Down Bayou DuBac").

He had the lead in Sam Katzman's A Yank in Korea (1951) and a Western, Montana Territory (1952). However he was mostly seen in TV: Tales of Tomorrow ("Verdict from Space"), "The Last Man on Earth", ("Enemy Unknown"), The Ford Television Theatre ("My Daughter's Husband"), Schlitz Playhouse ("Operation Riviera"), and Footlights Theater ("My Daughter's Husband"). His last feature film was Combat Squad (1953).

McCallister and William Eythe were producers of the stage musical revue Lend an Ear, which began at Los Angeles' Las Palmas Theater and launched Carol Channing's career.

Post-acting career
In 1953, at the age of 30, McCallister retired from acting. Later, he became a successful real estate manager, wealthy from his investments.

After retirement, he still appeared in two television series, as Coley Wilks in the 1961 episode "The Hostage" of the ABC western series, The Rebel, starring Nick Adams; and as Willie in the 1963 episode "Triple Indemnity" of the CBS sitcom, The New Phil Silvers Show. In 1963 he said, "I'm happy. I'm doing what I want".

In a 1992 interview, McCallister said, "Being a movie star was great, but I never considered doing it for a lifetime. I wanted to be myself, to go where I pleased without causing a traffic jam. I've succeeded in this, and I'm happy".

Personal life
McCallister was a long time romantic partner of fellow actor William Eythe, up until Eythe's death in 1957. He died from congestive heart failure at the age of 82.

Filmography

References

External links

 

1923 births
2005 deaths
20th-century American male actors
American male film actors
American male child actors
American gay actors
LGBT people from California
Male actors from Los Angeles
20th-century American LGBT people